Sarkaphung, also called Shikiphung or Sikiphung, is a village south of Ukhrul in Ukhrul district, Manipur state, India. The village is partially connected by National Highway 150, which connects Imphal and Kohima via Ukhrul and Jessami. The village is flanked by Litan in the north, Thoyee in the south, Sinakeithei in the west, and Marao Shingkap in the east. The inhabitants speak Sarkaphung Tui, which belongs to the Tibeto-Burman language family.

Total population 
According to 2011 census, Sarkaphung has 202 households with the total of 1084 people, of which 560 are male and 554 are female. Of the total population, 156 were in the age group of 0–6 years. The average sex ratio of the village is 936 female to 1000 male, which is lower than the state average of 985. The literacy rate of the village stands at 74.03%, which is lower than the state average 76.94%. Male literacy rate stands at 80.46%, while female literacy rate was 67.26%.

People and occupation
The village is home to people of Tangkhul Naga tribe. The majority of the inhabitants are Christians. Agriculture is the primary occupation of the inhabitants. Sarkaphung is one of the 44 villages considered likely to be affected as a catchment area when the Mapithel multi purpose project is functional.

References

Villages in Ukhrul district